Ten Green Bottles is a book by Vivian Jeanette Kaplan and a play based on the book.  It is the true story of a Jewish family that escaped from Nazi-occupied Vienna to Shanghai under Japanese rule.

The book was published in English in Canada and in the U.S. by St. Martin's Press in 2004 and has been republished in Germany (as Von Wien nach Shanghai), Italy (as Dieci Bottiglie Verdi), Hungary (as Sanghaji Fogsag) and China (as 十个绿瓶子). In Canada it won the Canadian Jewish Book Award and in Italy won the ADEI (Associazione Donne Ebree d'Italia) - WIZO Award. It has received generally positive critical reviews in the North American press.

The title of the book comes from the song sung in Marco's Bar by British servicemen stationed in Shanghai.

Plot
The book is told from the viewpoint of the author's mother and starts in 1921. Gerda Karpel (referred to always as Nini in the book) is a 5-year-old Jewish girl living in Vienna in 1921. She comes from an upper-middle-class family. The book starts with the birth of Nini's brother, Willi, and chronicles the death of Nini's father shortly after the birth. The book then discusses day-to-day life from the viewpoint of a Jewish girl growing up in Vienna. It talks about the political instability caused after the assassination of Engelbert Dollfuss and the suppression of democracy after it.

The Anschluss occurs, and Nini desperately tries to secure tickets to Shanghai. She receives help from Herr Berger, a Gentile Vienna lawyer, and obtains tickets for her family and for her friend's parents. The book then mentions the infamous Kristallnacht and the lead up to their departure. In Chapter 19, the Karpel family arrives in Shanghai. They struggle to survive through the poverty and violence that greets them on arrival and to the moving of most Jews into a ghetto in the Hongkou District. During that time, they purchase ownership in a bar owned by Marco, a Bulgarian Jew; this is where Nini heard the song "Ten Green Bottles". The book ends with the family leaving Shanghai for Richmond Hill, Canada.

Play
The critically acclaimed world premiere of the play was performed in English in Toronto, Canada in 2009.  All performances were sold out and seen by over 4,000 people. It was produced by Helena Fine of Te-Amim Theatre and written and directed by Mark Cassidy of Threshold Theatre.

External links 
 Vivian Jeanette Kaplan website
 On the Writing of Ten Green Bottles
 Reading Group Guide
 Teacher's Guide
 Student's Guide

2004 non-fiction books
World War II memoirs
Jewish Chinese history